Yadrino is a rural locality (a selo) and the administrative center of Chernigovsky Selsoviet of Arkharinsky District, Amur Oblast, Russia. The population was 475 as of 2018. There are 29 streets.

Geography 
Yadrino is located on the right bank of the Khingan River, 98 km southeast of Arkhara (the district's administrative centre) by road. Obluchye is the nearest rural locality.

References 

Rural localities in Arkharinsky District